Kang Ji-hwan (born Jo Tae-gyu; March 20, 1977) is a South Korean actor. He began his career in musical theatre, and has since starred in television dramas such as Be Strong, Geum-soon! (2005), Capital Scandal (2007),  Hong Gil-dong (2008), Lie to Me (2011), Incarnation of Money (2013), Big Man (2014) and Children of a Lesser God (2018) as well as the films Rough Cut (2008) and My Girlfriend Is an Agent (2009).

Career

2002–2005: Beginnings and rising popularity
Jo Tae-gyu made his acting debut in musical theatre in 2002, in the Korean stagings of popular musicals The Rocky Horror Show and Grease. From 2003 to 2004, using the stage name Kang Ji-hwan, he began appearing in small roles on television, which included the sitcom Nonstop 4 and the Korean dramas Summer Scent and Save the Last Dance for Me.

2005–2008: First fame film roles and commercial peak
Kang shot to fame in 2005 with Be Strong, Geum-soon!, in his first onscreen leading role as a fastidious doctor who falls for a widowed hairdresser (played by Han Hye-jin). The drama increased his pan-Asian popularity, particularly in Japan, China, and Taiwan. He then made his big screen debut in the role of a Jehovah's Witness who befriends an unemployed professor in the independent film Host and Guest, which traveled the international film festival circuit.

Kang continued acting on television but his 2006 dramas Fireworks, about two cosmetics firm employees who plot revenge against their exes (opposite Han Chae-young), and 90 Days, Time to Love, about a terminally ill married man who's in love with his cousin (opposite Kim Ha-neul), received low viewership ratings. In 2007, he and Han Ji-min starred in Capital Scandal, a period drama adapted from Lee Sun-mi's novel set in Japanese-occupied Korea. His portrayal of a carefree playboy who transforms into an independence fighter garnered positive reviews.

2008 became a successful year for Kang. He was cast as the titular Joseon folk hero in Hong Gil-dong, written by the Hong sisters. Kang said his portrayal was inspired by Stephen Chow, and the fusion-period-dramedy became a TV cult hit. Later that year, he also starred in Rough Cut, a low-budget film directed by Jang Hoon and written by Kim Ki-duk about a gangster who wants to become an actor and a hot-tempered star who acts like a thug. Kang and costar So Ji-sub were praised for their performances, and both won several Best New Actor awards.

2009–2012: Commercial success and comeback in film
Kang then reunited with previous leading lady Kim Ha-neul in My Girlfriend Is an Agent, a 2009 action-romantic comedy in which their characters are former lovers and spies trying to conceal their professions from each other. It became the fourth highest grossing Korean film of that year, with more than 4 million tickets sold. Afterwards, he played a looks-oriented architect whose eye problem magically causes him to see the homely heroine (played by Lee Ji-ah) as beautiful in The Relation of Face, Mind and Love, a "telecinema" which received a brief theatrical release and a TV run.

In 2010, Kang starred in romantic comedy series Coffee House, in which he played an eccentric novelist who is caught in a love triangle with his publisher (played by Park Si-yeon) and his assistant (played by Ham Eun-jung). This was followed by his return to the stage in the musical revival Cafe In, a love story between a male sommelier and a female barista. Kang produced the show's Korean and Japanese runs, and he also starred in the latter, becoming the first Korean actor to perform at the Tokyo Globe Theatre.

Kang and Yoon Eun-hye then starred in 2011's Lie to Me, playing a hotelier and a civil servant who fake being married to each other after she tells a white lie that quickly spreads through the gossip channels.

The 2012 comedy film Runway Cop reunited him with previous costar Sung Yu-ri (from Hong Gil-dong) and director Shin Tae-ra (from My Girlfriend Is an Agent). During filming, Kang gained 12 kilograms and shed 15 kilograms two weeks later for his role as an overweight and messy detective who goes undercover as a fashion runway model to solve a case. Following that, he and Lee Ki-woo appeared in a 25-minute "music video drama" to promote Kim Hyung-jun's EP Escape.

2013–2015: Success roles
In 2013, Kang starred in Incarnation of Money, in the role of a prosecutor with ties to a loan shark. Then in 2014's Big Man, he played a "good-for-nothing" orphan who is tricked into thinking that he is the long-lost eldest son of a wealthy tycoon's family, when they only want to harvest his heart for a transplant.

Kang and Yoon Jin-seo shot the gangster love story Heartbreak Hotel in Los Angeles and Las Vegas, and the indie was released in 2015. He was next cast in the Korean-Chinese romantic comedy A-lister Fall from the Sky, about a scandal-ridden Hallyu star who goes to China and encounters his biggest fan (played by Jiang Yuan).

2016–2017: Other films and later popularity
Kang reunited with Hong Gil-dong and Runaway Cop co-star Sung Yu-ri in revenge melodrama Monster, which aired in 2016. In 2018, Kang starred in his first cable drama Children of a Lesser God, playing a genius detective. The same year, he starred in the workplace comedy Feel Good to Die.

2018–2020: Focus on roles and other works
In 2019, Kang starred in the series Joseon Survival Period, but due to sexual assault allegations against him, he was replaced by Seo Ji-seok from episode 11 onward.

Contract disputes
In 2010, Kang was sued for breach of contract by his former talent agency Jambo Entertainment. Kang had signed with S-Plus Entertainment after asking to be released from his contract with Jambo, which the latter claimed was still valid for eight months. S-Plus stated that of the six years that Kang was with Jambo, he was without a contract for three years, and after receiving no response from their overtures regarding Jambo's "unfair terms," they took steps to legally terminate Kang's contract. Upon mediation, the Corea Entertainment Management Association (CEMA) instructed Kang to suspend his entertainment activities for eight months, but when he starred in Coffee House anyway, CEMA members threatened to boycott him unless he dropped out of playing the leading role in Faith.

In 2012, S-Plus Entertainment moved to extend Kang's contract with them for an additional eight months, citing his lack of projects for that same length of time due to CEMA's edict. When Kang refused and began entrusting his business affairs to his lawyer, S-Plus sued him for breach of contract. In 2013, the Seoul Central District Court dismissed the lawsuit and upheld the validity of the original contract; the court also ordered S-Plus to pay Kang  in damages after the agency defamed him in the press.

Sexual assault allegations

Arrest and sexual content disputes
On July 9, 2019, Kang was arrested over allegations that he sexually molested and assaulted two of his agency's female employees at his home. Kang stated that he remembered drinking with them but did not remember what happened afterwards. Kang’s agency, Huayi Brothers, issued an apology and sought another actor to replace Kang in his ongoing TV series. On July 15, 2019, Kang admitted to all charges against him and apologized to the victims. Following this, Huayi Brothers terminated their contract with Kang on July 16, 2019 and he decided to retire from the entertainment industry. On July 26, 2019, Kang was indicted with the criminal charges of quasi-rape and quasi-indecent acts by force. During the first trial, in September 2019, it was revealed that Kang had offered the victims a settlement before the trial, but they rejected it. 

On December 5, 2019, Kang was found guilty and sentenced to two years and six months imprisonment, suspended for three years of probation, by the Suwon District Court. Kang was also ordered to conduct 120 hours of social service, take part in 40 hours of sexual offender treatment and be restricted from employment for three years.

Filmography

Television series

Film

Music video

Variety show

Musical theatre

Discography

Awards and nominations

References

External links
Kang Ji-hwan Fan Cafe at Daum 
Kang Ji-hwan Japanese Fan Club 

Male actors from Seoul
South Korean male television actors
South Korean male film actors
South Korean male stage actors
South Korean male musical theatre actors
South Korean Buddhists
1979 births
Living people
Best New Actor Paeksang Arts Award (film) winners